Kevin Labeque (born ) is a French male  track cyclist. He competed in the individual pursuit event at the 2012 UCI Track Cycling World Championships.

References

External links
 Profile at cyclingarchives.com

1991 births
Living people
French track cyclists
French male cyclists
Place of birth missing (living people)